Perseus is a 900 kg (2,000 lb) thermobaric bomb made in Greece.

References
 

Aerial bombs of the United States
Guided bombs